The State Anthem of Ingushetia is one of the national symbols of the republic of Ingushetia, a federal subject of Russia, along with its flag and coat of arms. The anthem was composed and written by an Ingush poet Ramzan Tsurov in 1993. It was first adopted on 27 August 1993 then readopted officially on 7 December 2010.

Lyrics
In 1993, the Ingush national congress wanted an anthem for the Republic of Ingushetia, at which the poems written by Ingush poet Ramzan Tsurov were accepted. Later that year, Ingush composer Ruslan Zangiyev put Tsurov's poems into music. Subsequently, the Parliament of Ingushetia officially approved the State Anthem of Ingushetia.

Current lyrics

2005–2010 lyrics 
In 2005, Head Murat Zyazikov decided that the anthem of Ingushetia was too aggressive and did not reflect the "people's desire for peace, creation, good neighborly relations", so he approved a new version, titled "My Motherland" to the verses of the Ingush poet Said Chakhkiev. This version, used until 2010, was translated by Igor Lyapin.

Notes

References

External links
National Anthem of Ingushetia, downloadable version

Regional songs
Ingushetia
Ingushetia
Ingushetia
1993 songs